Seppina (minor planet designation: 483 Seppina) is a minor planet orbiting the Sun.

References

External links
 
 

Cybele asteroids
Seppina
Seppina
S-type asteroids (Tholen)
19020304